Kalama is a genus of lace bugs in the family Tingidae. There are at least 30 described species in Kalama.

Species
These 33 species belong to the genus Kalama:

References

Further reading

 
 
 
 
 
 
 
 
 
 
 

Tingidae
Articles created by Qbugbot